Young Joon Kwak (born 1984) is an artist and musician based in Los Angeles. Much of their work focuses on queer bodies, how they have been represented in art history, and how they form communities. They have exhibited and performed at art museums around the world. Kwak is the lead singer in the band Xina Xurner, and a founding member of the collective Mutant Salon.

Early life and education
Kwak was born and raised in Queens, New York Kwak received an MFA from the University of Southern California, MA in Humanities from the University of Chicago, and BFA from the School of the Art Institute of Chicago.

Work

Sculpture
Kwak's sculptural work has been exhibited locally and internationally. They have described their work as investigating “traditional patriarchal standards of beauty in relation to the history of white supremacy, imperialism, and current social justice issues.” Their sculptures often consist of amorphous bodily forms are made out of in plaster, plastics, resin, metal, fiberglass and lights. In a 2014 review for Hyperallergic Magazine, Alicia Eler wrote of Kwak's exhibition, "Young Joon Kwak’s work is neither binging nor representing — it is a purging, a releasing of one identity not necessarily for another, but for the continued evolution of the self in its variously emerging forms. The snake is free. She is a mutant alien being, continually evolving, a trans/feminine entity of force."

Mutant Salon
Mutant Salon was founded by Kwak in 2012 as a nomadic beauty salon, festive experimental performance event with their community of queer, trans, femme, POC, mutant, artists, and performers. The project has been a co-organized of Mutant Salon with Marvin Astorga, Sarah Gail Armstrong, Project Rage Queen, and Alli Miller. In the summer of 2018 Mutant Salon held a residency at Los Angeles Contemporary Exhibitions. As part of the exhibition they exhibited anonymous genital sculptures on loan from the ONE National Gay & Lesbian Archives, and a trio of extravagant wigs from Hollywood Wigs, a neighboring store on Hollywood Blvd. Mutant Salon has also taken place at numerous sites including the Broad Museum where the group engaged the public throughout the museums galleries, as well as the public space outside the institution, and the Hammer Museum.

Xina Xurner
Kwak is half of the electronic-dance-noise band Xina Xurner with Marvin Astorga. They are the lead singer of the band, and use heavily distorted vocals

Grants and awards
Kwak has received the Korea Arts Foundation of America's Artist Award in 2020, Rema Hort Mann Foundation's Emerging Artist Grant in 2018, and the Art Matters Grant in 2016.

Exhibition history
Kwak has exhibited at art galleries, museums, and DIY venues including: the Hammer Museum, The Broad, REDCAT, ONE National Gay & Lesbian Archives, in Los Angeles; Wattis Institute, Southern Exposure, San Francisco; Museum of Contemporary Art, Denver; Museum of Contemporary Art, Chicago; Antenna Space, Shanghai, China; Pavillon Vendôme Centre d’Art Contemporain, Clichy, France; the Art Museum of the National University of Colombia, Bogotá; and Walter Philips Gallery, Banff, Alberta, Canada.

References

Living people
Performance art in Los Angeles
1984 births
LGBT people from New York (state)
American LGBT artists
Transgender artists
Queer artists